Dobroflot or Dobrovolny Flot (Russian: Добровольный флот, Доброфлот, meaning "Voluntary Fleet") was a state-controlled ship transport association established in the Russian Empire in 1878 funded from voluntary contributions collected by subscription (hence the name). Also known as Russian Volunteer Fleet.

History

Dobroflot was founded in wake of the Russo-Turkish War (1877–78), with the intent of providing Russia with a fleet of fast armed merchantmen. By the time its first three ships were purchased from Hamburg American Line in June 1878, the war was already over, and the ships were instead used first as troopships to repatriate Russian soldiers from Turkey, then as peacetime merchant ships. The establishment of Dobroflot started an arms race among the world's major maritime powers, in which governments would subsidize the constructions of privately owned merchant ships, on the stipulations that these would be available for conversions to auxiliary cruisers during wartime.

Throughout its existence Dobroflot provided invaluable services for both the government and the economic development of Russia - particularly the Russian Far East, with Dobroflot established the first regular maritime link between Vladivostok and European Russia. Moreover, Dobroflot ships were requisitioned for naval services during both the Russo-Japanese War and World War I, thereby fulfilling the original raison d'etre of Dobroflot.

After the Russian Revolution and the Russian Civil War the ships of the fleet became dispersed over various countries, and Soviet Russia made efforts via international courts to have them returned. Dobroflot was restored in the Soviet Union in 1922 and included into the Sovtorgflot ("Soviet Commercial Fleet") in 1925.

See also
Dobrolyot

References

Dobroflot at "Departmental Flags of the Russian Empire" page  
People's Voluntary Fleet, В. Дукельский, Московский журнал № 8 — 2006 г. 
 

Transport companies established in 1878
Defunct shipping companies of Russia
Shipping companies of Russia
Defunct transport companies of Russia
Shipping companies of the Soviet Union
1878 establishments in the Russian Empire
Transport companies disestablished in 1925
1925 disestablishments in the Soviet Union